The Music Works (simply known as Music Works) is a South Korean entertainment company established in 2012 by Oh Won-chul (Philip Oh) joint-ventures with CJ E&M Music.

The label currently manages several artists, namely GilguBonggu (GB9), and U Sung-eun. It was formerly home to artists such as Baek Ji-young, Kim So-hee, MYTEEN, Minzy and B.O.Y.

Artists

Artists
Soloists
 U Sung-eun
 Kissxs
 Clo

Former artists/actors
Baek Ji-young (2014–2019)
Kim So-hee (2016–2019)
MYTEEN (2016–2019)
 Chunjin (2016–2019)
 Eunsu (2016–2019)
 Hanseul (2016–2019)
 Lee Tae-vin (2016–2019)
 Shin Junseop (2016–2020)
 Minzy (2016–2020)
 B.O.Y (2019–2021)
Song Yuvin (2016–2021)
Kim Kookheon (2016–2021)
 GB9 (2012–2021)

References

External links
 

South Korean companies established in 2012
Record labels established in 2012
Hip hop record labels
K-pop record labels
Soul music record labels
South Korean record labels
Talent agencies of South Korea
CJ E&M Music and Live subsidiaries